Madrasa El Unqiya is one of the madrasahs of the medina of Tunis.

Localization 
It is located in Onk El Jamal Street in the Medina of Tunis.

History 
It was built in 1333 era under the orders of the sister of the Hafsid sultan Abu Yahya Abu Bakr al-Mutawakkil. 
Muhammad Ibn Abdel-Salam al-Hawari, the professor of Ibn Khaldoun was the first director of this madrasah in 1341.
In the 16th century and during the Ottoman era, Ahmed Khodja Dey restored the madrasa and ordered to teach the Hanafite doctrine.
It became a classified monument in 19 October 1992.

Evolution

Nowadays, the madrasa is not used and in danger.

Architecture
It has the hafsid style of the 14th century and a typical architecture of the madrasa: a hall surrounded with four halls and 14 rooms.
It has also an oratory that was used as a teaching and a prayer room in the same time.
The facade of the madrasa has a simple decoration.

References 

El Unqiya